Stoyan Georgiev (born 18 September 1986, in Sofia) is a Bulgarian footballer who plays as a defender for Balkan Botevgrad.

Career
Georgiev was born in Sofia and started to play football in the local team Slavia. In 2005, he signed his first professional contract with the club, but over the course of two years played in only 7 matches. In January 2008 he was loaned to Spartak Varna for six months. In June of the same year Georgiev was loaned in Varna again for one season.

In February 2017, Georgiev joined Balkan Botevgrad.

References

External links 
 

1985 births
Living people
Bulgarian footballers
First Professional Football League (Bulgaria) players
PFC Slavia Sofia players
PFC Spartak Varna players
OFC Sliven 2000 players
FC Dunav Ruse players
PFC Lokomotiv Mezdra players
FC Oborishte players
Association football defenders